Sri Pratap Higher Secondary is an all-boys school located at M.A. Road, Srinagar. It is one of the oldest school in Srinagar, locally known as S.P school. It was established in 1874 by the King of Jammu and Kashmir himself, Maharaja Ranbir Singh and is named after his successor Sri Pratap Singh. The school has risen from ranks starting as a middIe school then a high school after that becoming a higher secondary school and being elevated to the status of Model School by the state government. It is a selective school that offers admission on the basis of merit . The school has produced a line of distinguished alumni.

History
Sri Pratap Higher Secondary School has history of 147 years. The school was established in 1874. Ranbir Singh was the first Dogra ruler who took interest in the advancement of education in the State of Jammu and Kashmir. In 1874, two schools were opened in the twin cities of Jammu and Srinagar. The schools were named as Ranbir High School Jammu and Srinagar Middle School. The Srinagar Middle School taught primary subjects of Sanskrit and Persian, however not as a regular system. The subjects were taught in the same way as in Maktabs and Chat halls. There was a separate department of teaching Arabic to Muslim students. In 1883 there were 450 boys on its roll.

It was with the advent of the reign of Sri Pratap Singh of Jammu and Kashmir in 1885 AD that modern education in the State took shape. Dr. A.K. Mitra (Superintendent of Schools) known as the father of education in Kashmir, zealously worked for the upliftment of Kashmiris and raised the status of Srinagar Schools to a full-fledged Anglo Vernacular School, introducing English and imparting instructions according to Panjab University Curriculum. In 1891, the school was raised the status of Srinagar High School and was later on called Sri Pratap High School.
                                                
In 1912 AD S.P. School was reorganized and a postgraduate was appointed as the Head Master along with two trained graduates as teaching assistants. In 1913-1914 provision of teaching science and drawing subjects was introduced in the school. Later in 1921 Physical Education was introduced with accompaniment of music. In 1949-50 AD Mr. M.M. Kazim, the then Director School Education called a conference on social education and discussed the reorganisation of schools in Jammu & Kashmir state. On the recommendation of the conference, S.P. High School was elevated to S.P. Higher Secondary School as was affiliated to J&K University. At the same time crafts like wood carving, paper mache, embroidery, spinning and weaving were introduced in the school.

In 2015, the school was raised to the status of "Model School" by the State Government, Chief Minister, Mufti Mohammad Sayeed inaugurated the school as Model School on 14 September 2015.

List Of Principal Of SP Higher Secondary School

Location
The school is situated at M.A Road, Kothi Bagh, central area of Srinagar city in the capital of Jammu and Kashmir.

Departments
The school has four departments. The activities of the departments are looked over by Heads Of Departments.

Houses
 Iqbal House
 Mehjoor House
 Shah-I-Hamdan House
 Sheikh Ul Alam House

Notable alumni
Mufti Mohammad Sayeed
Javied Bhat

Laboratory
The school has laboratory facilities for Physics, Chemistry, Botany, Zoology, Biotechnology and Biochemistry.

Smart class
The school has established two smart class rooms with internet connectivity where in students of all the classes and all streams get chance to learn once in a week according to a time schedule.

References

Schools in Srinagar